Tenuipalpus elegans is a species of mite in the genus Tenuipalpus.

References

External links 

Trombidiformes
Animals described in 1973